Ofstad is a surname. Notable people with the surname include:

Augvald, Norwegian petty king
Kari Ofstad (born 1961), Norwegian sprint canoer
Jarle Ofstad (1927–2014), Norwegian physicist
Einar-Fredrik Ofstad (1916–1998), Norwegian diplomat
Per Ofstad, Norwegian chess master